Mississippi Valley Mayhem (MVM) is a women's flat track roller derby league based in La Crosse, Wisconsin. Founded in 2008, the league consists of a single team which competes against teams from other leagues. Mississippi Valley is a member of the Women's Flat Track Derby Association (WFTDA).

History
The Mayhem was founded in August 2008 by two local women, Amanda Boucher and Stephanie Powers, after Boucher encountered the sport on a visit to Austin, Texas. By May 2009, the league had twenty skaters, and had played two bouts to around 200 fans.

The league was accepted into the Women's Flat Track Derby Association Apprentice Program in January 2010, and it graduated to full membership in December 2012.  In May 2011, one of its practice venues, the Green Island Ice Arena, was severely damaged by a tornado.

WFTDA rankings

References

Roller derby leagues established in 2008
Roller derby leagues in Wisconsin
La Crosse, Wisconsin
Women's Flat Track Derby Association Division 3